Sir Edward Leigh Pemberton  (14 May 1823 – 31 January 1910) was an English  Conservative Party politician.

Leigh Pemberton was the son of Edward Leigh Pemberton by Charlotte Cox, daughter of Samuel Compton Cox. He was the nephew of Lord Kingsdown.

He was elected to the House of Commons as a Member of Parliament (MP) for East Kent at a by-election in May 1868, after the sitting Conservative MP Sir Brook Bridges had been ennobled as Baron FitzWalter.  Leigh Pemberton was re-elected at the general election in November 1868, and held the seat until the East Kent constituency was abolished at the 1885 general election. In 1898 he was made a Knight Commander of the Order of the Bath.

He was elected as chairman of Borden School Trust during its conception in 1875. Even when he left the Board and missed several meetings, he was immediately elected Chairman when he resumed attendance and all continued as though nothing had happened.

Leigh Pemberton married Matilda Catherine Emma Noel, daughter of Reverend Francis James Noel, in 1849. She died in January 1906. Leigh Pemberton died in January 1910, aged 86. His son Robert Leigh Pemberton was the grandfather of Robin Leigh-Pemberton, who was created a life peer as Baron Kingsdown in 1993.

References

External links 
 

1823 births
1910 deaths
Conservative Party (UK) MPs for English constituencies
UK MPs 1865–1868
UK MPs 1868–1874
UK MPs 1874–1880
UK MPs 1880–1885
Knights Commander of the Order of the Bath
People educated at Eton College
Alumni of St John's College, Oxford
Deputy Lieutenants of Kent
Edward